Crayford Manor House Astronomical Society is a local astronomy group established in 1961. It was once based in the historic Crayford Manor House, but since 2012 is in Sutton-at-Hone, Kent. The new location has an observatory called the Dick Chambers Sutton-at-Hone Observatory with a 16-inch telescope. The society meets weekly for observing sessions as well as lectures and other activities.

Publications
Members of the society have published many papers, including papers in the Journal of the British Astronomical Association, the Monthly Notices of the Royal Astronomical Society, Astronomy Now, Sky & Telescope, Practical Astronomy, The Observatory, and IBVS (Information Bulletin on Variable Stars).

Society members have also produced a number of shorter articles and book reviews.

See also
 List of astronomical societies

References

External links
Crayford Manor House Astronomical Society Dartford Website
 Crayford Manor House Astronomical Society Dartford on Twitter

Astronomy in the United Kingdom
Amateur astronomy organizations